Matalai Rural LLG was created from Wards 15–21 in the Namatanai Rural LLG and Wards 1-2 of Konoagil Rural LLG in the Namatanai district of New Ireland. It is located in the South East Coast of New Ireland Province. It has a population of 12,393 as of the 2011 PNG National Census. The current LLG President is Augustine Topi. Languages spoken here are Sursurunga language,Tanglamet language, Fanamaket language and Konomala language.

 Sursurunga at Ethnologue (18th ed., 2015)

References

Local-level governments of New Ireland Province